Ripley County Courthouse is a historic courthouse located at Doniphan, Ripley County, Missouri.  It was built in 1899, and is a two-story, brick building on a stone foundation with Second Empire style design influences.  It has a central clock tower and corner pavilions with mansard roofs.

It was added to the National Register of Historic Places in 1976.

References

County courthouses in Missouri
Courthouses on the National Register of Historic Places in Missouri
Second Empire architecture in Missouri
Government buildings completed in 1899
Buildings and structures in Ripley County, Missouri
National Register of Historic Places in Ripley County, Missouri